The United Methodist Council of Bishops is the organization of which all active and retired Bishops in the United Methodist Connection are members. In the United Methodist system of polity, the Council of Bishops is the Executive Branch of United Methodist Church government.

Bishop Cynthia Fierro Harvey currently serves as president of the Council of Bishops. The bishops of The United Methodist Church, both individually and collectively through the Council of Bishops, provide spiritual leadership to more than 11 million United Methodists in a broad range of settings on four continents: North America, Europe, Africa, and Asia.

Since the founding of the Methodist Episcopal Church at the Christmas Conference in Baltimore in 1784, United Methodist Bishops have presided over Annual and Central Conferences (regional areas of the church). They play an important leadership role in helping to set the direction of the church and its mission throughout the world. United Methodist Bishops preside over geographic areas of ministry, known as Annual Conferences, and supervise the appointment and ministry of each Annual Conference's clergy and the mission and ministry of each Annual Conference's congregations. Bishops are elected every 4 years (quadrennium) by each of the 5 Jurisdictional Conferences in the United States and the Central Conferences outside the United States. Once elected each Bishop is consecrated to the episcopacy for life and they serve in the Jurisdiction by which they were elected and consecrated. Just as all United Methodist clergy itinerate within the Annual Conference of which they are members, once elected Bishops itinerate within the Jurisdiction they are members of, serving a specific Annual Conference for 4 year terms, after which they may be reappointed or moved to another Annual Conference, on the recommendation of each Jurisdictional Committee on the Episcopacy and the authority of the full Jurisdictional Conference acting on those recommendations.

Bishops are responsible for supervising the ordination and character of the clergy under their leadership, and for fixing the appointment of each clergy member of an Annual Conference each year to a particular congregation, charge, circuit or other place of ministry and mission. The Bishop of each Annual Conference also presides over each session of the Annual Conference and is the executive officer of each Annual Conference. Each Bishop presides over a cabinet of District Superintendents, who are the Bishop's assistants who more directly supervise the ministry of clergy within each district within an Annual Conference. Districts are regionally based units within each Annual Conference, each of which is presided over by a District Superintendent (who must be an Elder in Full Connection with the Annual Conference in which they serve) and which has its own officers and structures that are accountable to the Bishop and the Annual Conference for the conduct of their mission and ministry.

While the United Methodist Council of Bishops is the Executive Branch of Church government, it is ultimately and only the General Conference of the United Methodist Church, which constitutes the Legislative Branch of Church government, that speaks for and sets the policies, missions and ministries of the United Methodist Church through its sole authority to maintain and change the United Methodist Discipline, the book that structures and rules United Methodism. Ultimately, the General Conference speaks for the United Methodist Church.

See also
College of Bishops
List of bishops of the United Methodist Church
Synod of Bishops

External links
United Methodist Council of Bishops Official Website
https://www.unitedmethodistbishops.org/